The 1986 Belfast East by-election was one of the fifteen 1986 Northern Ireland by-elections held on 23 January 1986, to fill vacancies in the Parliament of the United Kingdom caused by the resignation in December 1985 of all sitting Unionist Members of Parliament (MPs). The MPs, from the Ulster Unionist Party, Democratic Unionist Party and Ulster Popular Unionist Party, did this to highlight their opposition to the Anglo-Irish Agreement. Each of their parties agreed not to contest seats previously held by the others, and each outgoing MP stood for re-election.

References

External links 
A Vision Of Britain Through Time (Constituency elector numbers)

Other References
British Parliamentary By Elections: Campaign literature from the by-elections
CAIN: Westminster By-Elections (NI) - Thursday 23 January 1986
Northern Ireland Elections: Westminster by-elections 1986

Belfast East by-election
East
20th century in Belfast